Oxford USD 358 is a public unified school district headquartered in Oxford, Kansas, United States.  The district includes the communities of Oxford, Geuda Springs, Adamsville, Dalton, Kellogg, and nearby rural areas.

Schools
The school district operates the following schools:
 Oxford Jr/Sr High School
 Oxford Elementary School

See also
 List of high schools in Kansas
 List of unified school districts in Kansas
 Kansas State Department of Education
 Kansas State High School Activities Association

References

External links
 

School districts in Kansas